Horace DeVaughan (died April 8, 1927), of Birmingham, Alabama, was the first prison inmate in Alabama to be executed by the Alabama electric chair, nicknamed "Yellow Mama" because it was painted with bright yellow highway paint. DeVaughan was electrocuted on April 8, 1927.

The murder case for which DeVaughan was executed was solved by Birmingham Police Detective Paul Cole, who traced the shells found at the scene, which had a unique marking from a defective shotgun. After he was arrested, DeVaughan confessed to the murders and was sentenced to death.
DeVaughan was put to death at Kilby Prison in an electric chair built for the purpose earlier that year. He prayed to Jesus for hours beforehand, and accepted no food, drink or cigarettes on the night of the execution. In his final statement he expressed that he had been forgiven and had no hard feelings toward anyone, and asked for someone to tell his mother goodbye and that his soul was saved.
DeVaughan underwent three 2,000 volt discharges between 12:31 and 12:42 AM. At the first 40-second jolt his body surged forward, a thin gray smoke flowed from under the electrode over his head, and the odor of burning flesh was apparent. After the second discharge, flames were seen on his leg, but he was still alive. After the third jolt, he was pronounced dead. Twenty were present as witnesses, included Moore's brother, George, who traveled from Coffeyville, Kansas and claimed a piece of DaVaughn's belt as a souvenir of his visit.

References
Montgomery Advertiser, October 7, 2002.

1927 deaths
Year of birth missing
People from Birmingham, Alabama
20th-century executions by Alabama
People executed by Alabama by electric chair
20th-century executions of American people
Executed people from Alabama